Travels is the eleventh solo album by Japanese-American ukulele virtuoso, Jake Shimabukuro. It was released on October 9, 2015, by Hitchhike Records. The album peaked at No. 2 on the Billboard World Albums chart and No. 11 on its Heatseekers Albums chart.

Track listing

Musicians

Jake Shimabukuro – baritone ukulele, clapping, ukulele, vocals
Del Beazley – guitar, vocals
Michael Grande – keyboards, clapping
Chris Kamaka – upright bass, vocals
Noel Okimoto – drums, marimba, percussion, vibraphone, clapping
Jeff Richman – guitar
Dean Taba – bass, clapping
Sharene Taba – harp
Bryan Tolentino – ukulele, vocals
Asa Young – 12 string guitar, vocals
Chae Choe – clapping
Yukari Takai – clapping
Van Fletcher – clapping

Production

Milan Bersota – Producer, Engineer, Mixing Engineer
Dean Taba – Producer
John Baldwin – Mastering Engineer
Paul Grosso – Art Direction, Design
Carl Dunn – Photography
Chae Choe – Assistant Engineer
Yukari Takai – Management
Van Fletcher – Management

Track information and credits adapted from the album's liner notes.

Charts

References

2015 albums
Jake Shimabukuro albums